Renia hutsoni is a litter moth of the family Erebidae. It is found in North America, including Arizona, Colorado and Utah.

External links
Images
Moths of south-eastern Arizona

Herminiinae
Moths described in 1906